Agastyaarkoodam is one of the peaks in the Western Ghats of Thiruvananthapuram District of Kerala and Tirunelveli District of Tamil Nadu, India. This peak is a part of the Agasthyamala Biosphere Reserve which lies on the border between the Indian states of Tamil Nadu, Tirunelveli district and Kerala, Thiruvananthapuram district. The perennial Thamirabarani River originates from the eastern side of the range and flows into the Tirunelveli district of Tamil Nadu. It is 1,868-metres (6,129 ft) tall.

Agastyaarkoodam is a pilgrimage centre for devotees of the Hindu sage Agastya, who is considered to be one of the seven rishis (Saptarishi) of Hindu Puranas. In Tamil traditions, Agastya is considered as the father of the Tamil language and the compiler of the first Tamil grammar called Agattiyam or Akattiyam. There is a small stone statue of Agathiyar at the top of the peak and the devotees can offer pujas.

Agasthyamala Biosphere Reserve is among 20 new sites added by UNESCO to its World Network of Biosphere Reserves in March 2016. The International Co-ordinating Council added the new sites during a two-day meeting on 19 March 2016 in Lima, bringing the total number of biosphere reserves to 669 sites in 120 countries, including 16 transboundary sites. The biosphere reserve includes close to 300 rare bird species and more than 200 medicinal plants endemic to this region.

Geography

Agastyaarkoodam is 32 km from Neyyar Dam and 22 km from Bonacaud, near  VITHURA & PONMUDIThe major city and airport nearest to Agastyaarkoodam is Thiruvananthapuram (Trivandrum) and its Trivandrum International Airport, around 61 km away. The nearest railway stations are Thiruvananthapuram, Kerala and Ambasamudram, Tirunelveli District, Tamil Nadu. The trekking path, nearly 22 km, is from Bonacaud.

Kalakkad Mundanthurai Tiger Reserve is part of the Agastyaarkoodam range. Part of the peak can be seen from the Upper Kodayar region.

Other major rivers which originate from the mountain are the Karamana River, which flows through the Thiruvananthapuram district and is the major source of drinking water to the city, and the Neyyar River (also in the Thiruvananthapuram district).

Trekking routes 

The peak of Agastyaarkoodam can be reached only by trekking up to it. Trekking is allowed based on strict guidelines and is open to pilgrims during January to mid-March. Trekking passes are issued by Kerala Forest Department from the district office at Trivandrum. The trekking route starts from Bonacaud. The route "Neyyar-Agasthyakoodam" is not open to the public.

Vehicles reach only till Bonacaud which is around 50 km from Thiruvananthapuram. The trek to the peak is 20 km long from Bonacaud and requires two days. The first part of the trek can be started from the base station Bonacaud in the early morning and is 14 km through the forest to the camp. Elephants and wild bulls are in abundance in this part especially in the evenings. The final part i.e. the 6 km long trek can be done from the camp to the top of Agathyakoodam mountain on the second day.

Vegetation
The lower elevations of this peak are known for their abundance of rare herbs and medicinal plants. Around 2,000 medicinal plants used in Ayurvedic treatments are found here. Europeans, particularly those from England, were the first to establish tea gardens around the base stations of the mountain at Brimore, Bonacaud, and Ponmudi.

The Agasthyamala Biosphere Reserve harbours rare flora and fauna. Tourists are permitted to the area only with permission from the forest department of Kerala. Annual trekking passes to the peak are issued from the forest department during January–February only.

Important places

Manjolai Hills
Between elevations ranging from 1000 to 1500 metres, the Manjolai area is set deep within the Western Ghats within the Kalakkad Mundanthurai Tiger Reserve in the Tirunelveli District. Located on top of the Manimuthar Dam and the Manimuthar Water Falls, the Manjolai area has tea plantations, small settlements around the tea plantations, Upper Kodaiyar Dam, and a windy view point called Kuthiravetti.

The tea plantations and the whole of Manjolai Estates are operated by the Bombay Burmah Trading Corporation Ltd on forest lands leased by the singampatti zamin. There are three tea estates in the Manjolai area — Manjolai Estate, Manimutharu Estate, and Oothu Estate. The estates, road, and the settlements in the Manjolai area are managed by the Bombay Burmah Trading Corporation Ltd.

Former status prohibiting women 
Prior to November 2018, women were forbidden to climb Agastyaarkoodam. After a court ruling which removed the prohibition, a woman, Dhanya Sanal, an Indian Information Service officer, reached the peak in 2019, becoming the first woman known to make the climb. Since the change in the law, more than 100 other women have registered for a license to make the climb.

On 17 January 2020, at 71 years old Visalakshi Amma (from Coimbatore) along with her son (Vandhan) and daughter-in-law (Lakshmy Kolary) embarked on the climb. On the 18th she successfully scaled up to the PongalaPara and went beyond close to the first ropeway. But unfavorable climatic conditions (rain and dense fog) and health concerns forced her to return to the camp without scaling the peak (2 km short).

See also
 Agasthyamala Biosphere Reserve
 Indian Council of Forestry Research and Education
 Thamirabarani River
 Tirunelveli
 Papanasam
 Anamudi - Highest peak in Western Ghats
 Tourism in Thiruvananthapuram

References

External links

 Agasthya Crocodile Rehabilitation and Research Centre
Information on Agasthyarkoodam Trekking or Agasthyamalai Trekking 

Mountains of the Western Ghats
Tourist attractions in Thiruvananthapuram district
Tourism in Kerala
Mountains of Kerala
Geography of Thiruvananthapuram district